Samuel Joseph Fortescue Moore was an Australian politician. He was a member of the Western Australian Legislative Assembly representing Irwin from his election on 24 June 1904 until the end of his term on 21 October 1914. Moore was a member of the Western Australian Liberal Party. Before that, he was a member and chairman of the Greenough Road Board and a member and chairman of the Claremont Road Board.

References 

Members of the Western Australian Legislative Assembly
20th-century Australian politicians
Western Australian local councillors
Mayors of places in Western Australia
1846 births
1921 deaths